Liman National Type (Chinese) School is a public primary school in Liman Kati, a village in the Malaysian state of Perak. It is a Chinese national-type school, a government school in which Chinese is the main medium of instruction.

Notable alumni 

Chinese-language schools in Malaysia
Primary schools in Malaysia
Schools in Perak